Teresa is a Mexican telenovela produced by Lucy Orozco for Televisa in 1989.

Salma Hayek starred in her first and only protagonist role in telenovelas, together with Rafael Rojas, Daniel Giménez Cacho and Miguel Pizarro. The series and several of the actresses won awards in 1989 and 1990.

Plot
Teresa is a beautiful and intelligent young woman desperately seeking to get out of the grinding poverty of the neighborhood where she lives. Resentful of the miserable life that took her sister, she plans to use her beauty and intelligence to enter the world of luxury to which she wants to belong.

To this end, she enters her classmate and friend Aurora's group of friends. There she meets Aurora's cousin Raul, a young but neurotic millionaire with suicidal tendencies. Telling Raul that she is rich, coupled with her beauty, Raul becomes smitten with her. Even though he and Aurora discover that Teresa lied about her wealth, Raul is obsessed with her and forgives her.

Fearing that their opposition to the relationship will end with Raul's suicide, Aurora's parents accept the romance of Teresa and Raul. However, Teresa discovers that her deceit and ambition leads to unhappiness and loneliness.

Cast 

 Salma Hayek as Teresa Chavero Martínez
 Rafael Rojas as Mario Castro Guzman
 Daniel Giménez Cacho as Héctor de la Barrera
 Miguel Pizarro as Raúl Solórzano
 Patricia Pereyra as Aurora Molina
 Patricia Reyes Spíndola as Josefina Martínez de Chavero
 Claudio Brook as Don Fabián
 Mercedes Pascual as Enriqueta Martínez
 Alejandro Rábago as Armando Martínez
 Irma Dorantes as Juana
 Laura Almela as Luisa de la Barrera
 Rosa María Bianchi as Rosa Molina
 Héctor Gómez as Manuel Molina
 Nadia Haro Oliva as Eulalia Garay
 Omar Rodríguez as José Antonio Garay
 Marta Aura as Balbina
 Alfredo Sevilla as Ramón Castro
 Leonor Llausás as Gudelia
 Patricia Bernal as Esperanza
 David Ostrosky as Wilebaldo "Willy"
 Juan Carlos Bonet as José María
 Margarita Isabel as Marcela
 Araceli Aguilar as La Morena
 Jorge del Campo as Dr. Domingo Sánchez
 Antonio Escobar as Delfino
 Dora Cordero as Ceferina
 Jair De Rubín as Chamuco
 Germán Novoa as Monje
 Oscar Vallejo as Peluche
 Astrid Hadad as Margarita
 Amparo Garrido as Mariana
 Mario Iván Martínez as Sigfrido
 Rosa Elena Díaz as Lucha
 Norma Jacobi as Ana Celeste

Awards

References

External links
 

1989 telenovelas
Mexican telenovelas
1989 Mexican television series debuts
1990 Mexican television series endings
Spanish-language telenovelas
Television shows set in Mexico City
Televisa telenovelas
Television series reboots